Leonid Skotnikov (Леони́д Скотников; born 26 March 1951) is a Russian judge who served on the United Nations International Court of Justice in The Hague, Netherlands between 2006 and 2015.

Education 
Skotnikov attained a diploma in international law from the Moscow Institute of International Relations in 1974. In 1990 received a fellowship at the Center for International Affairs, Harvard University.

Publications 
 The Right of Self-Defence and the New Security Imperatives, In: International Affairs Vol. 9, 2004;
 Legal Limits of the Use of Force, In: International Affairs Vol. 11, 2003;
 Entering the XXI Century: Primacy of Law in International Relations In: International Affairs Vol. 12, 2000;
 Primacy of Law in Politics (Miverfasser), In: International Affairs Vol. 4, 1989.

External links
 ICJ Biography - Leonid Skotnikov
 Statement, Conference on Disarmament at the Plenary Meeting of the Conference on Disarmament

International Court of Justice judges
Russian judges
Living people
Harvard University people
Year of birth missing (living people)
Russian judges of United Nations courts and tribunals
Ambassadors of Russia to the Netherlands
Permanent Representatives of Russia to the United Nations Office at Geneva
Ambassador Extraordinary and Plenipotentiary (Russian Federation)